Muttley is a fictional dog created in 1968 by Hanna-Barbera Productions; he was originally voiced by Don Messick. He is the foil to the cartoon villain Dick Dastardly, and appeared with him in the 1968 television series Wacky Races and its 1969 spinoff, Dastardly and Muttley in Their Flying Machines. The character is known best for his mischievous, rasping laughter.

Characterization
Muttley first appeared in Wacky Races in 1968, as the sidekick of the accident-prone villain Dick Dastardly. While Dick was created as the equivalent of Professor Fate from the 1960s movie The Great Race, Muttley mirrored the film's character of Max Meen. Dastardly and Muttley were paired together in various later Hanna-Barbera series as bumbling villains.

As his name implies, Muttley is a mixed breed dog, identified in the Wacky Races segment "Dash to Delaware" as a mix of bloodhound, pointer, Airedale, and hunting dog. During Dastardly and Muttley in Their Flying Machines, in the episode Sappy Birthday, Muttley shows a calendar where April 16 is marked; his birthday. In an audio commentary for Dastardly and Muttley, the designers comment that they conceived of Muttley's shape as what a dog would look like if he were a tank-styled vacuum cleaner.

Muttley does not really talk; his main examples of speech are his trademark "wheezy snicker" (usually at Dick's expense, who sometimes retaliates by thumping him on the head) and a mushy, sotto voce grumble against an unsympathetic or harsh Dick (usually along the lines of "Snazza frazza rashin' fashin' Rick Rastardly!"). Don Messick had previously used Muttley's distinctive laugh for a recurring antagonist for Huckleberry Hound in the form of a black and white dog who enjoyed antagonising Huck the mailman, dogcatcher, barbecuer, etc. Messick also used the same laugh for the character of Griswold in an episode of Top Cat, then for an embryonic version of Muttley (called 'Mugger') appearing in the 1964 movie Hey There, It's Yogi Bear, as well as for another Hanna-Barbera canine, Precious Pupp, in 1966. He also repurposed it for Alexandra Cabot's cat Sebastian on Josie and the Pussycats in 1970.

Muttley (who turned from a "bluish hue" to a "dusty brown") wore only a collar in Wacky Races, but in Dastardly and Muttley in Their Flying Machines, he donned a World War I style aviator's cap and scarf, and served as a flying ace along with Dastardly and two other pilots as members of the "Vulture Squadron". In this spinoff, he also sported many medals and constantly demanded new ones from Dastardly for following his commands. Similarly, Dastardly frequently ripped medals off Muttley's chest as punishment for his incompetence. And it was upon joining Dastardly and Muttley in Their Flying Machines that Muttley gained the ability to fly in brief spurts by spinning his tail like a propeller.

Muttley also enjoyed his own short segment in the series Magnificent Muttley, where he would engage in Walter Mitty-style fantasies. The designers speculated that Muttley was popular that the producers wanted to give Muttley some time as a solo character.

Muttley vs. Mumbly
Muttley is sometimes confused with the crime-fighting dog Mumbly from The Mumbly Cartoon Show. Mumbly looked very similar to Muttley and had the same wheezy snicker, but their ears were different and Mumbly had blue fur and wore a trenchcoat. Mumbly later showed up as the captain of the villainous Really Rottens in Laff-a-Lympics along with his accomplice, "The Dread Baron," who resembles Dick Dastardly. The Dread Baron and Mumbly later appeared in the TV movie Yogi Bear and the Magical Flight of the Spruce Goose. It is not certain why Mumbly was retconned as a villain, neither is it certain why he and Dread Baron were apparently used as substitutes for Dastardly and Muttley, especially in the Yogi Bear movie where Paul Winchell voiced the Baron instead of Dastardly (and in the scene where the Baron's crashed plane is shown, it is Dick's plane from Dastardly and Muttley in Their Flying Machines, complete with the "D" on the side). In that story, Mumbly had once utilized his tail to fly just like Muttley does in Dastardly and Muttley in Their Flying Machines. The reason most suggested is that the Wacky Races characters (including Dastardly and Muttley) were not fully owned by Hanna-Barbera as the show was a co-production with Heatter-Quigley Productions.

An early version of the Muttley/Mumbly character appears in the 1964 Hanna-Barbera feature film Hey There, It's Yogi Bear!. This prototype Muttley ("Mugger") is a mean-spirited dog with a travelling circus who has a penchant for biting his owners on the leg. The character may also have been inspired by The Atom Ant Show'''s "Precious Pupp", who was known for laughing the same way. Muttley and his master returned in the Wacky Races video game with Billy West voicing the dog.

Other appearances

 Muttley and Dick Dastardly also starred as the villains in Yogi's Treasure Hunt in their submarine the SS. Dirty Tricks.
 Muttley appeared briefly in The Good, the Bad, and Huckleberry Hound.
 In the "Fender Bender 500" segment of Wake, Rattle, and Roll, he and Dick Dastardly are paired up as they were in the Wacky Races TV show. The car they drove looked similar to The Mean Machine, but was called "The Dirty Truckster". 
 Muttley appeared as a teenager in Yo Yogi! alongside Dick Dastardly.
 In the Duck Dodgers episode "MMORPD", one of the forms that Duck Dodgers turns himself into is Muttley. In this brief appearance, Muttley's vocal effects are done by Joe Alaskey.
 Muttley has made at least one brief appearance in Dynomutt.
 Muttley appears alongside Dick Dastardly as one of the main characters in the 2016 Wacky Raceland comic book. In this version, Muttley is reimagined as a mangy rabid dog with several robotic prosthetics and a taste for mutant flesh. It is revealed that he was a guinea pig in a lab experiment conducted by Professor Pat Pending and that its original codename was "SC-BB-02".
 Another version of Muttley appeared in Dastardly & Muttley, also published by DC Comics under the Hanna-Barbera Beyond initiative. This version is Cpt. Dudley "Mutt" Muller, a United States Air Force navigator and partner of Lt. Col. Richard "Dick" Atcherly, who is fused with his pet dog by the mysterious element "unstabilium".
 In the 2000 Wacky Races video game, Muttley was voiced by Billy West.
 Muttley appeared alongside Dick Dastardly in the animated Scooby-Doo film Scoob! (2020), where Billy West reprised his role, though the film used archival recordings of Messick for Muttley's laugh. In the film, Muttley was trapped in the underworld after an attempt by Dastardly to steal Alexander the Great's treasure from the Underworld through a dimensional portal serving as a back door. The plan backfired when the portal turns out to be one-way. Dastardly spent most of the film trying to save Muttley by going after the Skulls of Cerberus, and managed to do so in the film's climax. They were both captured by Dastardly's reformed robot henchmen the Rottens and taken away by Blue Falcon, Dynomutt, and Dee Dee Skyes to be handed over to the police. During the end credits, Muttley is shown breaking Dick Dastardly out of prison.
 Muttley makes a brief cameo appearance in the 2021 film Space Jam: A New Legacy. When the Warner Bros. Serververse inhabitants were making their way to the site of the basketball game between the Tune Squad and the Goon Squad, Muttley is seen trying to lunge at The Great Gazoo only to miss as the latter teleports away. Muttley's design is the same as the design seen in Scoob! Muttley is mentioned in the Jellystone! season 2 episode "Lady Danjjer: Is It Wrong to Long for Kabong?" He is mentioned to be Loopy de Loop's ex-boyfriend.

Cultural references
 In the Family Guy episode “April in Quahog”, while complaining about jury duty, Peter explains that even the vending machines at the courthouse are out of order, with Brian then being shown dressed and laughing in a similar manner as Muttley.
 Film director Quentin Tarantino has said he owns a stuffed animal toy of Muttley, and has given impressions of his signature laugh in interviews.
 Polish alternative rock band Magnificent Muttley is named after the character.
 In the Pingu episode "Pingu's Dangerous Joke", Pingu snickers like Muttley and also does his laughing gesture at one point.
 In the Kipper episode "Tiger's Joke Box", after Kipper gets surprised by a toy jumping out of a box, Tiger does Muttley's laughing gesture.
 In the anime series Cat Planet Cuties, the villain's sidekick is a robotic dog named Matrey whose appearance and laugh are an homage to Muttley.
 The 1994 motion picture The Mask, the title character's pet dog Milo inadvertently dons the mask. While wearing it, Milo becomes an animated caricature of himself. He then urinates on a villain while mimicking the smile and laughter of Muttley.
 The home console version of video game Duck Hunt'' by NES features an unplayable hound character. When missing the on-screen targets, the player is briefly giggled at in a similar manner and appearance to Muttley's.

See also
 List of Hanna-Barbera characters

References

Villains in animated television series
Television characters introduced in 1968
Hanna-Barbera characters
Television sidekicks
Fictional henchmen
Fictional dogs
Male characters in animation
Male characters in film
Male characters in television
Male film villains
Wacky Races characters
Scooby-Doo characters
Fictional racing drivers
Male characters in animated films
male characters in animated series